Panagiotis "Takis" Michalos (3 October 1947 – 3 January 2010) was a Greek water polo player and coach. He was born in Ampelokipoi, Athens.

Water polo playing career

Clubs
Michalos was the goalkeeper of Olympiacos, from 1962 until 1975. With Olympiacos, he won two Greek water polo championships (1969, 1971), and broke the dominance of Greek club water polo by Ethnikos.

National team
As a Greece men's national water polo team, Michalos took part in two Summer Olympics (1968, 1972), in one World Championship (1973), and in one European Cup (1970). He also took part in the Mediterranean Games in 1975.

Water polo coaching career

Clubs
Michalos was the coach of ANO Glyfada, from 1979 until 1985. With ANO Glyfada, he reached the final of the Greek Water Polo Cup in 1984. From 1985 to 1986, he was the coach of Olympiacos.

National team
Ιn 1986, Michalos joined the national squads as an assistant coach, and he worked as an assistant coach and coach in the national teams from 1987, until 2002. Within the aforementioned capacities, he was present at three Olympic Games, three World Championships, seven European Championships, four World Cups, and four Mediterranean Games. He led the Greek youth national team to the bronze medal in 1997. He was the coach of the Greek women's national team in 2000, and the Greek men's national team, in the summer of 2002.

Personal
Michalos died in 2010. He had two sons, Nikos and Manos. Nikos is a professional basketball player, and Manos is a journalist.

See also
 Greece men's Olympic water polo team records and statistics
 List of men's Olympic water polo tournament goalkeepers

References

External links
 

1947 births
2010 deaths
Greek male water polo players
Water polo goalkeepers
Water polo players at the 1968 Summer Olympics
Water polo players at the 1972 Summer Olympics
Olympic water polo players of Greece
Olympiacos Water Polo Club players
Water polo players from Athens